This is a list of mail server software: mail transfer agents, mail delivery agents, and other computer software which provide e-mail.

Product statistics
All such figures are necessarily estimates because data about mail server share is difficult to obtain; there are few reliable primary sources—and no agreed methodologies for its collection.

Surveys probing Internet-exposed systems typically attempt to identify systems via their banner, or other identifying features; and report Postfix and exim as overwhelming leaders in March 2021, with greater than 92% share between them.

SMTP

POP/IMAP

Mail filtering

Mail server packages
 Mail-in-a-Box
 iRedmail
 Modoboa
 Mailcow
 Poste.io

See also
 Comparison of mail servers
 Message transfer agent

References

Message transfer agents
Mail servers